The San Carlos Apache Police Department is the tribal police agency responsible for law enforcement within the jurisdiction of the San Carlos Apache Indian Reservation. The agency is responsible for about 10,000 persons.

Substations
 San Carlos
 Bylas
 Apache Gold Casino

See also

 List of law enforcement agencies in Arizona

References

External links
 Facebook profile of the SCAPD

County government in Arizona
Law enforcement agencies of Arizona
Native American tribal police